Rhinolophus hilli, Hill's horseshoe bat, is a species of bat in the family Rhinolophidae. It is endemic to Rwanda.  Its natural habitats are subtropical or tropical moist montane forests, caves, and subterranean habitats (other than caves). In 2013, Bat Conservation International listed this species as one of the 35 species of its worldwide priority list of conservation. It is threatened by habitat loss.

Taxonomy
As the genus Rhinolophus is quite speciose, it is split into groups. Maclaud's horseshoe bat is the identifier of one of these groups, called the maclaudi group, which currently consists of six species, three of which were not described before 2003. Members of this group have large ears, and a diminished connection between the sella and lancet.
 Maclaud's horseshoe bat—R. maclaudi
Rhinolophus willardi—discovered in 2013
Ruwenzori horseshoe bat— R. ruwenzorii
Hill's horseshoe bat—R. hilli
Rhinolophus kahuzi—discovered in 2013
Ziama horseshoe bat—R. ziama
R. maclaudi and R. ziama are considered the two West African taxa, while the other four species are found further east around the Albertine Rift. The West African species are larger in size than the East African species, with R. maclaudi as the largest bat of the species group. As these species are very similar morphologically, it was previously thought that R. hilli and R. ruwenzorii were the same taxon, and that the taxon was a subspecies of the Maclaud's horseshoe bat.

Conservation
The first two individuals of this species were encountered in 1964 and 1981. It is unknown where this species roosts during the day. In 2019, Hill's horseshoe bat was documented again for the first time since 1981, when single individual was found in Nyungwe National Park in Rwanda. Its calls were recorded, and the species has since been acoustically identified at eight other sites in the area.

References

Rhinolophidae
Bats of Africa
Mammals of Rwanda
Endemic fauna of Rwanda
Mammals described in 1973
Taxonomy articles created by Polbot